Hugo von Pohl (25 August 1855 – 23 February 1916) was a German admiral who served during the First World War. He joined the Navy in 1872 and served in various capacities, including with the new torpedo boats in the 1880s, and in the Reichsmarineamt (Imperial Navy Office) in the 1890s. He eventually reached the rank of Vizeadmiral and held the position of Chief of the Admiralty Staff in 1913. He commanded the German High Seas Fleet from February 1915 until January 1916. As the commander of the surface fleet, he was exceedingly cautious, and did not engage the High Seas Fleet in any actions with the British Grand Fleet. Pohl was an outspoken advocate of unrestricted submarine warfare, and he put the policy into effect once he took command of the fleet on 4 February 1915. Seriously ill from liver cancer by January 1916, Pohl was replaced by Reinhard Scheer that month. Pohl died a month later.

Biography

Early career
Hugo von Pohl was born in Breslau, Prussian Silesia, on 25 August 1855. He entered the Kaiserliche Marine (Imperial Navy) as a cadet in April 1872. At the age of 24, Pohl was promoted and given command of the sailing corvette . In the 1880s, he served with then-Korvettenkapitän Alfred von Tirpitz in his so-called "Torpedo Gang", which advocated a greater emphasis on torpedo boats in the German fleet. Pohl took command of the spar torpedo vessel , an early, experimental torpedo boat, in 1882. Two years later, in late September 1884, he was involved in an experiment with new torpedo boat designs from Schichau, Thornycroft, AG Vulcan, and AG Weser; Pohl commanded one of the Schichau boats. During the exercises, Pohl's boat collided with the boat commanded by August von Heeringen. The former's boat sprung a leak, while the latter's rudder was damaged, but both safely returned to port.

By the 1890s, Pohl had been transferred to the Reichsmarineamt (Imperial Navy Office), where he would again work with Tirpitz after the latter was appointed as the State Secretary of the Navy. In 1900, Pohl was assigned to the fleet that was sent to China to help suppress the Boxer Uprising. While in China, he commanded the protected cruiser , which bombarded the Taku Forts. In May of that year, Pohl was promoted to Korvettenkapitän. He was promoted to the rank of Konteradmiral in 1906. Thereafter he served as the commander of the reconnaissance forces of the German fleet. Pohl was promoted again, to Vizeadmiral, in January 1913. That year, he was elevated to the nobility and, in April, became the Chief of the Admiralty Staff, a position he would hold for two years.

As Chief of the Admiralty Staff, Pohl was involved in the German deliberations during the July Crisis in the aftermath of the assassination of Archduke Franz Ferdinand by Serbian terrorists the previous month. Pohl, Helmuth von Moltke, the Chief of the German General Staff, and Theobald von Bethmann Hollweg, the Chancellor, met the Kaiser after the monarch returned from a cruise to Norway with the bulk of the High Seas Fleet. Pohl and the others were present at several meetings with the Kaiser, which ultimately produced the "blank check" Wilhelm II extended to Austria-Hungary; this decision ultimately helped to push Europe into the First World War by the end of the month.

First World War

At the outbreak of war, Pohl, along with Georg von Müller, the Chief of the Imperial Naval Cabinet, and Friedrich von Ingenohl, the commander of the High Seas Fleet, believed that since the war would be over quickly, the fleet should be preserved intact. Together, they agreed that the fleet should be restrained to provide local defense of the German coast, rather than seek a decisive battle against the numerically superior British Grand Fleet. Pohl argued that U-boats should be used to attack British merchant shipping. He pushed for fewer restrictions on the conduct of the commerce war beginning in late 1914; he further advocated abandoning the cruiser rules that handicapped the German effort, in favor of unrestricted submarine warfare. He presented his first plans for an unlimited commerce war in November 1914, but these were rejected by the Kaiser and Bethmann Hollweg so as not to antagonize neutral nations, in particular the United States.

After the Battle of Dogger Bank, Pohl replaced Ingenohl as commander of the High Seas Fleet; throughout his tenure as its commander, Pohl adopted a very cautious strategy in order to preserve the strength of the fleet. Pohl was a controversial choice to replace Ingenohl, in large part owing to his caution with the employment of the surface fleet. Two days after taking command, on 4 February 1915, Pohl gave the order to use unrestricted submarine warfare against the Allies; he had managed to convince Bethmann Hollweg by falsely promising him that U-boat commanders could distinguish between enemy and neutral steamers, and thus avoid provoking the United States. The policy was short-lived, however, as on 7 May 1915, the U-boat  torpedoed and sank the passenger liner , causing a diplomatic crisis with the United States. To avoid drawing America into the war, Germany reinstated restrictions on the U-boat fleet.

Aboard his flagship, Pohl conducted a series of short operations into the North Sea over the course of 1915. None of these operations ventured outside of the southern end of the North Sea, and the fleet never encountered any British forces. Pohl became seriously ill from liver cancer on 8 January 1916 and was taken to a hospital ship. He was subsequently moved to Berlin for surgery. He was relieved of command due to his poor health on 23 January; his replacement as fleet commander was Reinhard Scheer. Pohl died a month later, on 23 February. Shortly before his death, he was awarded the Order of the Red Eagle with oak leaves and swords for his command of the fleet. In 1920, Pohl's widow Ella published some of his papers in an effort to defend his reputation from postwar criticisms.

Citations

References

External links 

1855 births
1916 deaths
Companions of the Order of the Bath
Imperial German Navy admirals of World War I
Military personnel from Wrocław
People from the Province of Silesia
Deaths from liver cancer
Commanders of the Order of the Dannebrog
Officiers of the Légion d'honneur
Recipients of the Order of the Sacred Treasure
Commanders of the Order of Aviz
Commanders First Class of the Order of the Sword
Recipients of the Iron Cross (1914), 1st class
Admirals of the Imperial German Navy
Deaths from cancer in Germany